Totenpass (plural Totenpässe) is a German term sometimes used for inscribed tablets or metal leaves found in burials primarily of those presumed to be initiates into Orphic, Dionysiac, and some ancient Egyptian and Semitic religions. The term may be understood in English as a "passport for the dead". The so-called Orphic gold tablets are perhaps the best-known example.

Totenpässe are placed on or near the body as a phylactery, or rolled and inserted into a capsule often worn around the neck as an amulet. The inscription instructs the initiate on how to navigate the afterlife, including directions for avoiding hazards in the landscape of the dead and formulaic responses to the underworld judges.

Examples
The burial site of a woman also in Thessaly and dating to the late 4thcentury BC yielded a pair of Totenpässe in the form of lamellae (Latin, "thin metal sheets", singular lamella). Although the term "leaf" to describe metal foil is a modern metaphorical usage, these lamellae were in this case cut in the shape of cordate leaves probably meant to represent ivy; most Totenpässe of this type are rectangular. The Greek lettering is not inscribed in regular lines as it is on the rectangular tablets, but rambles to fit the shape. They had been arranged symmetrically on the woman's chest, with her lips sealed by a gold danake, or "Charon's obol", the coin that pays the ferryman of the dead for passage; this particular coin depicted the head of a Gorgon. Also placed in the tomb was a terracotta figurine of a maenad, one of the ecstatic women in the retinue of Dionysus.

Although the meandering and fragile text poses difficulties, the inscriptions appear to speak of the unity of life and death and of rebirth, possibly in divine form. The deceased is supposed to stand before Persephone, Queen of the Dead, and assert "I have been released by Bacchios himself."

Interpretation

Günther Zuntz made the most complete survey of gold tablets discovered up to 1971 (at Thurii, Crete, and elsewhere), categorizing them into three groups that have become the typological standard. Zuntz presented transcribed text coupled with a reconstruction, and interpreted their religious foundation as Pythagorean rather than Orphic. Philologist Richard Janko proposed that GroupB from Zuntz's collection derived from a single archetype, for which he offered a hypothetical Greek text and the following English translation while attempting, he emphasized, not to rely on preconceptions about underlying theology:

The most widely available source that discusses the Orphic gold tablets is the classic (if superseded in some aspects) Orpheus and Greek Religion by W. K. C. Guthrie. Since the 1990s, the usefulness of the term "Orphic" has been questioned by scholars, as has the unity of religious belief underlying the gold tablets. More recently the association of the tablets with Orphism has been defended.

Totenpässe have also been found in tombs from Palestine dating from the 2ndcentury BC and later. These tiny gold sheets employ a formulaic consolation that appears regularly on funerary steles in the area: , (here the name of the deceased is inserted),  ("Take courage, [name], no one is immortal"). In one instance, the inscribed tablet was shaped like a funerary headband, with holes to bind it around the forehead.

References

Further reading
 Bernabé, Alberto, and Ana Isabel Jiménez San Cristóbal. Instructions for the Netherworld: The Orphic Gold Tablets. Boston: Brill, 2008.
 Bernabé, Alberto. "Some Thoughts about the 'New' Gold Tablet from Pherai." Zeitschrift für Papyrologie und Epigraphik 166 (2008): 53–58.
 Comparetti, Domenico, and Cecil Smith. "The Petelia Gold Tablet." The Journal of Hellenic Studies 3 (1882): 111–18.
 Dickie, M.W. "The Dionysiac mysteries in Pella." Zeitschrift für Papyrologie und Epigraphik 109 (1995) 81–86.
 Edmonds, Radcliffe. Myths of the Underworld Journey: Plato, Aristophanes, and the 'Orphic' Gold Tablets. New York: Cambridge University Press, 2004.
 Ferrari, Franco, and Lucia Prauscello. "Demeter Chthonia and the Mountain Mother in a New Gold Tablet from Magoula Mati." Zeitschrift für Papyrologie und Epigraphik 162 (2007): 193–202. Print.
 Freh, J. "Una nuova laminella 'orfica'." Eirene 30 (1994) 183–184.
 Graf, Fritz, and Sarah Iles Johnston. Ritual Texts for the Afterlife: Orpheus and the Bacchic Gold Tablets. New York: Routledge, 2007.
 Marcovich, M. "The Gold Leaf from Hipponion." Zeitschrift für Papyrologie und Epigraphik 23 (1976) 221–224.
 Merkelbach, Reinhold. "Ein neues 'orphisches' Goldblaiittchen." Zeitschrift für Papyrologie und Epigraphik 25 (1977) 276.
 Merkelbach, Reinhold. "Zwei neue orphisch-dionysische Totenpässe." Zeitschrift für Papyrologie und Epigraphik 76 (1989) 15–16.
 Merkelbach, Reinhold. "Die goldenen Totenpässe: ägyptisch, orphisch, bakchisch." Zeitschrift für Papyrologie und Epigraphik 128 (1999) 1–13. (A collection of examples providing the Greek texts with German translation, also line drawings of Egyptian examples.)
 Zuntz, Günther. Persephone: Three Essays on Religion and Thought in Magna Graecia. Oxford: Clarendon, 1971.

Death customs
Ancient Greek religion
Ancient Roman religion